Jordan Helliwell (born 23 September 2001) is an English professional footballer who plays for Barnsley, as a defender.

Early and personal life
Helliwell attended Ossett Academy.

Career
Helliwell joined Barnsley in April 2012 at the age of 10, and was the Academy Player of the Year for the 2017–18 season. He made his debut on 13 November 2018 in the EFL Trophy.

In October 2020 he joined Stalybridge Celtic on loan returning to Barnsley in December. He played five times whilst on loan - four Northern Premier League games and one in the FA Trophy.

In May 2021 it was announced by Barnsley that he had been retained at the club.  It was announced in July, that along with fellow club players, Matty Wolfe, Steven Simpson and Charlie Winfield he was joining Barnsley's sister club Esbjerg fB in Denmark on loan for six months.

In March 2022, Helliwell signed for Basford United on loan.

References

2001 births
Living people
English footballers
Barnsley F.C. players
Association football defenders
Stalybridge Celtic F.C. players
Basford United F.C. players
Esbjerg fB players
English expatriate sportspeople in Denmark
Northern Premier League players
Expatriate men's footballers in Denmark
English expatriate footballers